The 2004 World Series of Poker (WSOP) was held at Binion's Horseshoe after Harrah's Entertainment purchased the casino and the rights to the tournament in January. Harrah's announced that future WSOP tournaments will be held in a moving circuit of member casinos.

Preliminary events

Main Event
There were 2,576 entrants to the main event - more than three times the number of the previous year. Each entry paid $10,000 to enter what was the largest poker tournament ever played in a brick and mortar casino at the time.  Many entrants, including the overall winner, won their seat in online poker tournaments. 1995 Main Event Champion Dan Harrington made the final table for the second consecutive year. His bid for a second Main Event title came up short once again as he finished in fourth place.

Final table

*Career statistics prior to the beginning of the 2004 Main Event.

Final table results

Other High Finishes
NB: This list is restricted to top 30 finishers with an existing Wikipedia entry.

See also
World Series of Poker Tournament of Champions

World Series of Poker
World Series of Poker